Tsung-Tung Chang (1930-2000) was a Taiwanese-German economist and Sinologist.

Biography 

Chang was born in a village near Taichung in Taiwan in 1930. He acquired a Bachelor of Arts degree in Economics from Taihoku Imperial University in the 1940s. In 1956 he moved to Frankfurt am Main, where in February 1961 he received his doctorate degree. He then worked as an employee at the Federal Statistical Office in Wiesbaden. During this time, he became a German citizen.

In 1967, Otto Karow, the chair for East Asian philology and cultural studies at the Johann Wolfgang Goethe University, hired Chang as a Chinese lecturer. Here Chang began to study Chinese oracle bone inscriptions, which he submitted to Karow in 1970 as a dissertation. This was the first major work in a Western language on the subject. When the professorship for Sinology was re-established in 1973 as part of the reorganization of the university, Chang was appointed professor.

Chang conducted research in the fields of Chinese paleography and classical philosophy, and in the 1980s he conducted intensive Sino-Indo-European lexical studies. Under his leadership, the China Institute, which went under in the Second World War, was re-established as a registered association. With a series of lectures, exhibitions and concerts, he succeeded in building on the legacy of his predecessors Richard Wilhelm and Erwin Rousselle. Chang retired in 1999, and died shortly thereafter.

Bibliography 
 Tsung-Tung Chang: . VS Verlag für Sozialwissenschaften, 1965
 Tsung-Tung Chang: . Westdeutscher Verlag, 1961
 Tsung-Tung Chang:  Harrassowitz, 1970
 Tsung-Tung Chang:  Chuang-Tzu: . Klostermann, 1982
 
http://www.sino-platonic.org/complete/spp007_old_chinese.pdf

Further reading 
 Wolfgang Behr: . Digitalisat
 Heiner Roetz: . In: Asien, Nr. 77, Oktober 2000, S. 157–59
 Heiner Roetz: . In: Georg Ebertshäuser/Dorothea Wippermann: Wege und Kreuzungen der Chinakunde an der Johann-Wolfgang-Goethe Universität Frankfurt am Main. IKO Verlag für Interkulturelle Kommunikation, 2007, S. 239–248

1930 births
2000 deaths
20th-century Taiwanese economists
German sinologists
Taiwanese emigrants to Germany
Academic staff of Goethe University Frankfurt
National Taiwan University alumni